Chevrolet Cheyenne may refer to:

Chevrolet C/K (a trim package for this truck line)
Chevrolet Silverado (post-C/K Silverado marketed in Mexico)
Chevrolet Cheyenne (concept car)

Cheyenne
Pickup trucks